The 1999 Vuelta a España was the 54th edition of the Vuelta a España, taking place from 4 September starting in Murcia and finishing in Madrid on 26 September 1999. The favourites were Laurent Jalabert, Alex Zülle, Jan Ullrich and defending champion Abraham Olano. In the end, Ullrich won the race.

Teams and riders

Route

Jersey progress

Results

Final General Classification

KOM Classification

Points Classification

Team classification

References

 
1999
1999 in Spanish road cycling
September 1999 sports events in Europe